Muhammad Abul Huda al-Yaqoubi (born 7 May 1963) is a Syrian Islamic scholar and religious leader. He has opposed both Bashar al-Assad and Abu Bakr al-Baghdadi.

Early life and background
Al-Yaqoubi was born in Damascus, Syria. He comes from a family of Islamic scholars that traces its roots back to Morocco and has taught the Islamic sciences for centuries. His father, Ibrahim al-Yaqoubi (d. 1985) was a scholar. His paternal grandfather Ismail al-Yaqoubi (d. 1960) was a scholar and Sufi master. His father's maternal uncle was Arabi al-Yaqoubi (d. 1965), and his paternal uncle was Sharif al-Yaqoubi (d. 1943). Amongst al-Yaqoubi's  predecessors three have held the post of Maliki Imam at the Grand Umayyad Mosque of Damascus.

Al-Yaqoubi is a descendant of the Islamic prophet Muhammad, tracing his lineage through Mawlay Idris al-Anwar, (founder of the city of Fès), who was a descendant of Hasan ibn Ali, the grandson of Muhammad.

Education
Al-Yaqoubi's father took care of his upbringing, and he was both his teacher and spiritual master. His father gave him several ijazah, or certificates of authority to teach, narrate and issue legal rulings under Islamic law.

Al-Yaqoubi also received training from his father in Sufism, until he attained qualification as a murshid and the rank of a spiritual master in the Sufi tradition.

Al-Yaqoubi has also received ijazat from prominent scholars of Syria including: the Maliki Mufti of Syria, Makki al-Kittani; the Hanafi Mufti of Syria, Muhammad Abul Yusr Abidin; Ali al-Boudaylimi of Tlemcen, Abdul Aziz Uyun al-Sud, Salih al-Khatib, Zayn al-'Abideen at-Tounisi, Muhammad Wafa al-Qassaaband and Abd al-Rahman al-Shaghouri of Damascus.

In 1987, al-Yaqoubi completed a degree in Arabic Literature at the University of Damascus within the Faculty of Islamic Law. He then studied philosophy for two years at the Beirut Arab University.

In 1991, he joined the PhD program of linguistics in the Oriental Studies Department of the University of Gothenburg. In Sweden, he worked as a researcher and teacher of Arabic literature. In 1999, the Swedish Islamic Society appointed him mufti of Sweden. Al-Yaqoubi is "fluent in several languages including Arabic, English, and Swedish"    and sacred knowledge organisation states that he has trained several hundreds of scholars, imams and preachers

Career
Al-Yaqoubi started teaching Qur'an studies and recitation at the Darwishiyya Mosque at the age of 11. He delivered his first Friday sermon at the age of 14 at al-Saadaat Mosque, was appointed as Friday Imam and speaker (Khatib) at the age of 17 and was appointed as a teacher of Islamic studies at the age of 20.

In the mid-2000s, al-Yaqoubi returned to Syria and began preaching and teaching the Islamic sciences such as Aqidah (Islamic theology), Tafsir (Qur'anic exegesis), Hadith (Prophetic tradition), Tasawwuf (Sciences of the heart), Fiqh (Islamic jurisprudence), Usul (origins and fundamentals), Mustalah (hadith terminology), and Nahw (Arabic grammar).

Al-Yaqoubi previously resided in Damascus and was a public teacher at institutions there. He taught Islamic theology at the Umayyad Mosque; and he held the position of Jumu'ah Khatib (Friday speaker) at the Jami' al-Hasan Mosque; at the Mosque of Ibn Arabi, he taught from al-Risalah of Abd al-Karīm ibn Hawāzin Qushayri and Shamaail Tirmidhi of Tirmidhi. He was a public speaker in both Arabic and English. In June 2011, al-Yaqoubi was forced into exile by the Assad government and moved to Morocco.

Al-Yaqoubi is currently writing, publishing new works and continuing to teach under Sacred Knowledge, an initiative dedicated to the spreading of orthodox Islam.

Involvement in the Syrian Civil War 2011–present

In April 2011, al-Yaqoubi was one of the first Sunni clerics to express his support for the Syrian uprising and condemn the Syrian government's response to peaceful demonstrations. In August 2011, the BBC reported that al-Yaqoubi had called for more international pressure on the government of Syria after Government forces renewed their crackdown on protesters. He was forced into exile in 2011.

Despite other leading scholars initially calling for minor reforms, al-Yaqoubi was early to demand the resignation of President Bashar al-Assad.

Al-Yaqoubi initially fully supported Kofi Annan's "Six-point plan" urging for "international pressure on Russia and China" to force the end of the conflict in Syria.

He advocates the establishment of a democratic free state in Syria alongside championing the "vital role" of the Islamic scholar in preventing the break-up of Syrian society after the fall of Assad.

As the conflict has protracted, al-Yaqoubi publicly urged Jordan and Turkey to intervene militarily in Syria "to save the Syrian people", voicing frustration at the failure of the international community to intervene. In addition, he believes that any intervention will be undertaken by the United Nations, NATO, or the United States because it's "more realistic".

Al-Yaqoubi has been an active participant in the political process to form a credible political alternative to the Assad government. However, due to political intrigue, his appointment to be a full member of the Syrian National Council was blocked almost as soon as it was to be formally confirmed.

Since the start of the Syrian uprising, al-Yaqoubi has campaigned internationally to provide humanitarian aid for Syrian refugees. In December 2012, he led a convoy for the delivery of "vast quantities of food, baby food and blankets" to displaced Syrians in Turkey.

Consequently, he fled the country after the Syrian regime tried to silence him after he publicly criticised the ruling Arab Socialist Ba'ath Party, calling on the president to step down and supporting the Syrian uprising. He is currently in exile in Morocco, helping to deliver humanitarian aid, and is in regular contact with Syrian fighters who consult him on the moral and spiritual issues raised by their struggle. After his exile from Syria, he has taken part in a sustained international effort to provide aid for the Syrian people. He has publicly urged the international community to "implement help immediately" and to "lift the siege" on Syria in an interview with Sky News.

In August 2013, al-Yaqoubi said he wants the Free Syrian Army (FSA) to open a register in which fighters, civilians and administrators can be organized and given an identification number. He also thinks there should be recruitment centers in major towns and cities in the Middle East to pre-empt individual efforts, where those who want to fight can be vetted and trained under the FSA 's supervision.

In September 2014, al-Yaqoubi co-signed an open letter to Islamic State of Iraq and the Levant (ISIL) chief Abu Bakr al-Baghdadi saying "misinterpreted Islam into a religion of harshness, brutality, torture and murder" and refuting the ideological foundation of ISIS, banning Muslims from joining it and making it clear that this is non-Islamic, anti-Islam. In November 2014, he led prayers at the funeral of the American Peter Kassig. In an interview with CNN's Christiane Amanpour he condemned the killing of Kassig by ISIL and said, "We have to speak loud and very clear that Muslims and Islam have nothing to do with this... ISIS has no nationality. Its nationality is terror, savagery, and hatred." In the same month in an interview with Margaret Warner on PBS NewsHour he said of al-Baghdadi, "He's against Islam. He's non-Muslim, according to the Muslim standards, because he's allowing people to kill Muslims, referring to the Book of Allah [Quran], wrongly using religious texts. This is anti-Islamic. He's going against God. He's going against the message of Islam, Muhammad, peace be upon him. If he repents and come in a court and defend himself, he won't have any one single verse of the Quran to defend his opinion in killing innocent people." In March 2015, he said that ISIL has a sophisticated system of fallacies, and he referred to the extremists as "ignorant", "stupid" and "arrogant".

Views
On 22 January 2010, al-Yaqoubi refuted the comments made by Mufti of Syria Ahmad Bader Hassoun on 19 January 2010 about the Prophet Muhammad. Al-Ya'qoubi explained the necessity to obey the Messenger in every command including the news about the Qur'an and the names of the prophets. Al-Ya'qoubi asserted, "we know that Moses and Jesus are prophets only because our Prophet Muhammad told us so. Had he told us otherwise, we would have had to believe him...believing in Moses and Jesus does not imply the validity of Judaism and Christianity of today." He also asked Mufti Hassoun to resign his job out of embarrassment and to protect the dignity of Islam and the integrity of the Islamic scholars of Syria. The following day al-Yaqoubi was dismissed as Friday public speaker of al-Hasan Masjid in Abu Rummaneh, Damascus by the government. Six months later he was re-instated.

On 21 June 2010, al-Yaqoubi declared on Takbeer TV's programme Sunni Talk that the Mujaddid of the Indian subcontinent was Ahmed Raza Khan, and said that a follower of Ahlus Sunnah wal Jamaah can be identified by his love of Khan, and that those outside of that those outside the Ahlus Sunnah are identified by their attacks on him.

On 18 August 2011, al-Yaqoubi led prayers from a stage in Summerfield Park, Winson Green, Birmingham to some 20,000 people who gathered to remember three men killed while attempting to protect their neighbourhood from rioters and looters during the England riots. At the ceremony he said that "they made themselves an example of what a Muslim should be and what Islam is" and that "these three people are martyrs and the best we can do for them is to pray for them and for ourselves - to pray for our community." He asked for 18 August to be made a "day not of mourning and sadness but a day of bravery."<

Al-Yaqoubi had been a critic of Mohamed Said Ramadan Al-Bouti's stance of supporting the Syrian government. However, after Al-Bouti's assassination on 21 March 2013, al-Yaqoubi claimed that Al-Bouti was a martyr and that he had been privately readying to defect from the Syrian government.

In August 2013, al-Yaqoubi said: "Animosity against a state cannot be declared by individuals or groups; no Islamic government is in a state of war with the UK; they all have diplomatic relations and therefore, any attack against UK citizens or interests would be deemed as un-Islamic and illegal in the Shari’a, regardless of whether we approve of UK policies or not, or its government".

In the April 2016 issue of Dabiq Magazine, The Islamic State of Iraq and the Levant declared him a murtadd (or apostate).

Awards
In 2012, al-Yaqoubi was listed in The 500 Most Influential Muslims by Georgetown University's Prince Alwaleed Center for Muslim–Christian Understanding and the Royal Islamic Strategic Studies Centre of Jordan  as well as being listed in the honourable mentions in both 2015 and 2016

Personal life
In 1985, al-Yaqoubi's father, Ibrahim al-Yaqoubi, died. In 2006, al-Yaqoubi's first wife, Farizah, died in a car accident, he personally wrote a eulogy on an online obituary in which he stated that she used to pray 100 rak’as of salah every day.

Selected bibliography

Books
Al-Lum’atul Mārdiniyah fī sharhil Yāsaminiyah: A study The Shimmer of Al-Māridinī in the Explanation of the Treatise by al-Yāsamīn, (Arabic), Dār Ibn ‘Ābidīn, 1985
Al-Anwar fi Shama'il al-Nabiy al-Mukhtar, by al-Baghawi, preface and indices, Al-Maktabu publishing House
Ahkam al-Tas'ir fil: Fiqh al-Islamic Rulings on Price-fixing in Islamic Law, Dar al-Basha'ir al-Islamiyyah, Beirut, 2000’'
Husn al-Fahm li Mas'alati al-Qadā'i fil 'Ilm: Understanding Court procedures according to Magistrates' knowledge, Dar al-Basha'ir al-Islamiyyah, Beirut, 2000’'
Refuting ISIS: A Rebuttal Of Its Religious And Ideological Foundations
Refuting ISIS: A rebuttal of its religious and ideological foundations (Arabic copy) 
Foreword, Lights of Yearning: In Praise of the Most Praised ﷺ, by Walid Lounès Bouzerar, Dar al-Habib, 2015
Al-Anwar Al-Muhammadiyyah: The Prophetic Lights
Refuting ISIS, Second Edition, Sacred Knowledge, 2016
Inqādh Al-Ummah إنقاذ الأمة the Arabic of Refuting ISIS, Second Edition 
The Manners Of Debate (Arabic Edition) (Arabic) Paperback – 25 April 2016’'Judgement of Hadith Narrators (Arabic Edition) Paperback – 26 June 2016 In the Shade of the Levant, Arabic edition, Publisher Sacred Knowledge Seeking Knowledge: The Principles & Etiquette (Arabic), Sacred Knowledge 2016Celebrating Love and Theology: Refutation of the Mu'tazilites (Arabic Edition), Sacred Knowledge, Beirut, 2017,A Compendium of the Prophet Muhammad's Noble Names, Rabat, 2017’'
 Shamā´il al-Ḥabib al-Muṣṭafā شمائل الحبيب المصطفى ﷺ (The Prophet Muhammad ﷺ - His Beauty and Perfection) (Arabic), First Edition, Sacred Knowledge 2017
 Sahih al-Bukhari (Edition Facsimile Of Sultan Abdul Hamid II’s Publication of Sahih Al-Bukhari Al-Shareef), Signatora 2019
 Madhkal: The introduction to the Sahih (Arabic), Signatora 2019
 Saḥā´ib an-Nadā سحائب الندى (The Raining Clouds) (Arabic), Signatora 2019
 Shamā´il al-Ḥabib al-Muṣṭafā شمائل الحبيب المصطفى ﷺ (The Prophet Muhammad ﷺ - His Beauty and Perfection) (Arabic), Second Edition, Signatora, 2019
 Al-Futūḥāt Al-Maghribiyyah الفتوحات المغربية (The Moroccan Revelations) (Arabic), First Edition, Signatora, 2020
 The Moroccan Revelations (English), First Edition, Signatora, 2020

Audio CDsInvocations of the Heart (Volume 6)Love and MarriageThe Book of Knowledge: Imam al-GhazaliYasin: The Heart of the Qur'anInvocations of the HeartThe Miracle of the FigThe Champion of Truth: Abu Bakr al-SiddiqIslam: The Religion of LoveLight upon Light Dream Interpretation 
 Unbroken Chain 
 Ignorance the Disease of our Time  
 Sacrifices in Being a Muslim (Group CD) 
 The Divine Power, 2002 
 The Miracles of the Prophet (PBUH) 
 In the Footsteps of the Beloved 
 Visiting the Messenger of Allah 
 Where Then are you Going? 
 Anger: The Door to all Evil 
 Yearning for the Beloved 
 In Need of Allah 
 Remembering Allah 
 The Information Age 
 Islam and Democracy 
 The Key to know Him is to know him 
 Landmarks in the Life of the Prophet (PBUH) 
 Pearls of Wisdom (with Dr. Nazeer Ahmed) 
 The Perfect Mirror - Seeing the Prophet in your Dreams 
 The Rightly Guided Caliphs 
 Seekers of Knowledge 
 The Sublime Love''

See also
Sheikh Abubakr Ahmad
Arab people
Islam in Syria
Syrian people
Maliki
Shadhili
Sufism

References

External links

Sacred Knowledge website

1963 births
Living people
Syrian Sunni Muslims
Sunni Sufis
Syrian Sufis
Syrian poets
Sufi poets
Maliki fiqh scholars
Hanafi fiqh scholars
Scholars of Sufism
Syrian non-fiction writers
People from Damascus
Damascus University alumni
Beirut Arab University alumni
University of Gothenburg alumni